Fusion of powers is a feature of some parliamentary forms of government where different branches of government are intermingled, typically the executive and legislative branches. It is contrasted with the separation of powers found in presidential, semi-presidential and dualistic parliamentary forms of government, where the membership of the legislative and executive powers cannot overlap. Fusion of powers exists in many, if not a majority of, parliamentary democracies, and does so by design. However, in all modern democratic polities the judiciary does not possess legislative or executive powers.

The system first arose as a result of political evolution in the United Kingdom over many centuries, as the powers of the monarch became constrained by Parliament. The term fusion of powers itself is believed to have been coined by the British constitutional expert Walter Bagehot.

Pros and cons
One advantage of a fusion of powers, according to promoters, is that it is easier for the government to take action. There exists virtually no way for there to be a deadlock in the manner that can sometimes occur where the legislature and executive are separated. See, however, the 1975 Australian constitutional crisis for a counter-example (regarding the dual executive nature of some parliamentary systems).

The disadvantage of a fusion of powers, paradoxically, is the power it gives to the executive branch, rather than the legislative branch. In a fusion of powers, the head of government must have the confidence of a majority in the legislature. If the majority is made up of members of one's own party, the head of government can use these supporters to control the legislature's business, thus protecting the executive from being truly accountable and at the same time passing any laws expedient for the government. A revolt by members of the government's own party (or, if the government is a coalition or minority government, by supporting parties) is possible, but party discipline, along with a tendency by many electorates to vote against unstable governments, makes such a revolt unattractive and therefore rare.

Many states have responded to this by instituting or retaining multicameral legislatures, in which all houses must pass legislation in the same form. The responsible house is usually the most powerful and the only house with the actual power to terminate the government. Other houses, though, can often veto or at least delay controversial bills, perhaps until the government's performance can be judged by the electorate. They also provide additional forums for inquiry into the conduct of the executive. In addition, since the government's future is not at stake in other houses, members of the governing party or coalition in these houses can be freer to oppose particular government policies they disagree with. A second approach to curbing executive power is the election of the responsible house by some form of proportional representation, as in the case of Japan and Israel. This often, but not necessarily, leads to coalitions or minority governments. These governments have the support of the legislature when their survival is at stake but less absolute control over its proceedings.

A fusion of powers was specifically rejected by the framers of the American constitution for fear that it would concentrate a dangerous level of power into one body. However, other countries reject the presidential system for the same reason, arguing it concentrates too much power in the hands of one person, especially if impeachment and removal from office is difficult.

Examples

Australia
Australia has a partially Westminster-derived parliamentary system in which the executive branch is entirely composed of members of the legislative branch. Government ministers are required to be members of parliament—but the federal judiciary strictly guards its independence from the other two branches.

Canada
Canada, like other parliamentary countries using the Westminster system, has a fusion between the executive and the legislative branches, with the Prime Minister and other Cabinet ministers being members of Parliament. Senator Eugene Forsey of Canada remarked that "in Canada, the Government and the House of Commons cannot be at odds for more than a few weeks at a time. If they differ on any matter of importance, then, promptly, there is either a new government or a new House of Commons." However, the two branches have distinct roles, and in certain instances can come into conflict with each other.  For example, in June 2021, the Speaker of the House of Commons directed a member of the public service to comply with an order of the House of Commons to share certain documents with the Commons, and the public servant has refused to do so.  The federal government has announced that it will challenge the Speaker's ruling in the Federal Court.

Denmark
The Danish government relies on the confidence of the parliament, Folketinget, to stay in power. If there is a successful motion of no confidence against the government, it collapses and either a new government is formed or new elections are called. The executive branch thus relies on the legislative branch.

France
The current French Fifth Republic provides an example of the fusion of powers from a country that does not follow the Westminster system. Rather France follows a model known alternatively as a semi-presidential system or 'mixed presidential-parliamentary' system, which exists somewhere between parliamentary democracies and presidential democracies.

Israel
Israel has a Westminster-derived parliamentary system, in which the Government is generally made up of members of the Knesset, Israel's parliament. It is legally possible in Israel to appoint ministers who are not members of Knesset, but that is usually not done. By law, the Prime Minister and Deputy Prime Minister must be members of Knesset.

Sweden
The parliamentary system in Sweden has since its new constitution in 1974 instituted a fusion of powers whereby the principle of "popular sovereignty" serves as the guiding light of principle of government and forms the first line of the constitution.

United Kingdom
The United Kingdom is generally considered the country with the strongest fusion of powers. Until 2005, the Lord Chancellor was a full fusion of all branches, being speaker in the House of Lords, a government minister heading the Lord Chancellor's Department and head of the judiciary.

See also
 Constitutionalism
 Constitutional economics
 Mixed government
 Parliamentary sovereignty
 Rule according to higher law
 Responsible government

Notes

References

Constitution of the United Kingdom
Political science terminology
Constitutional law
Separation of powers